The Hachijō language shares much of its grammar with its sister language of Japanese—having both descended from varieties of Old Japanese—as well as with its more distant relatives in the Ryukyuan language family. However, Hachijō grammar includes a substantial number of distinguishing features from modern Standard Japanese, both innovative and archaic.

Hachijō is head-final, left-branching, topic-prominent, often omits nouns that can be understood from context, and has default subject–object–verb word order. Nouns do not exhibit grammatical gender, nor do they usually indicate grammatical number.

Pronouns and demonstratives
Like Japanese, Hachijō distinguishes first and second person pronouns, and has proximal, mesial, distal, and interrogative demonstratives. Hachijō uses demonstrative pronouns in place of third-person pronouns.

Pronouns
The pronominal system of Hachijō has been partly inherited from Old Japanese and partly borrowed from Modern Japanese:

The pronouns ware, are, unu, and dare often use irregular nominative/genitive forms with ga: waga, aga, uNga, and daga. The form uNga  can also be pronounced NNga .

Hachijō has a variety of nuances among many of its personal pronouns:

First-person pronouns
Unlike Japanese, both ware and are (and their variants) are considered ordinary and show no particular variations with regard to politeness, honorifics, or humility. Instead, they vary in usage based on the speaker, dialect, and context. For example, it is possible for both to appear in the same utterance:

Other variations include the contraction of -re to -ĭ, and the contraction of -re-wa to -ra or -rja when combined with the topic marker wa. For example, uncontracted ware and warewa would be considered more feminine than contracted waĭ and wara in the Mitsune dialect, whereas in the Uphill dialects, ware and warewa would be the norm (with the contracted forms generally unused).

Second-person pronouns
Like in Japanese, it is most common to refer to an addressee by name rather than by using a pronoun. Nevertheless, several second-person pronouns do exist:

 The pronoun omee is honorific, used for individuals of superior status. As the subject of a clause, omee is generally used with other honorific vocabulary such as the verbs ozjarowa ("to go, to come") and tamourowa ("to give").
 The pronoun omi is polite, used for individuals whom the speaker wants to respect, but for whom the honorific omee would be excessively formal. Aside from a handful of polite verbs like wasowa ("to go, to come") and gouzirowa ("to see"), sentences with omi generally use ordinary vocabulary. The form omi is never seen without a particle.
 The pronoun omaĭ is between omi and unu, used of those of equal or lower status. It is mildly informal or neutral, and it is often used in place of unu when people outside of the speaker's in-group are present. It is a comparatively new pronoun.
 The pronoun unu is very informal or familiar, and it is used for family members, and close friends. However it can be somewhat rude or vulgar, depending on the dialect.
 The pronoun nare is offensive and shows contempt, being used when fighting, arguing, scolding, etc.

The second-person pronouns omee, omi and omaĭ originate in borrowings of Japanese  omae "you." In modern Japanese, omae is familiar or derogatory, but it formerly had a respectful meaning, and it is in this respectful usage that it was borrowed into Hachijō.

The pronoun unu has cognates in Old and Middle Japanese 己 ono2 ~ unu "yourself, myself, oneself." Similarly, 汝 na ~ nare "you" is found in Old Japanese (including Eastern Old Japanese) and Early Middle Japanese.

Third-person pronouns
Hachijō has no dedicated third-person pronouns. When necessary, demonstratives—most often distal ones—are employed to indicate the equivalent of the third person. For example, when referring to people:

 ure~uĭ and uĭcu are informal, used for people within one's in-group, as well as for people whom the speaker does not care about showing respect to.
 The form uno hito (plural uno hitora) is polite, used for people outside of one's in-group. It comes from a compound of uno "that" and hito "person."
 The form uno kata (plural uno katara) is honorific, used for referring to superiors. It comes from a compound of uno "that" and kata "person (honorific)."

Interrogative pronouns
The interrogative personal pronouns are dare "who" for human referents and ani "what" for non-human referents (cognate to Japanese 誰 dare "who" and 何 nani "what"). The pronoun ani is often contracted to aN- when consonant-initial particles are adjoined to it.

Hachijō dare is related to the Old Japanese pronoun ta ~ tare "who," but it is unclear whether the change of initial t to d was borrowed from Japanese or was an independent parallel innovation.

Hachijō ani derives directly from Eastern Old Japanese *ani "what," which is attested indirectly in Eastern Old Japanese compounds like aze "why" and ado2 "whatever" (contrast the Western Old Japanese forms naze and nado2, whence Modern Japanese なぜ naze "why" and など nado "et cetera"). There are also a handful of other Hachijō interrogatives historically derived from compounds with ani, such as ada "how," aNde "why," and aNsei "why."

To form indeterminate pronouns from interrogatives, the suffix -ka is added. In contrast to Japanese, this -ka is added after any case suffix, not before, e.g., Hachijō anjoka (ani=o=ka) vs. Japanese 何かを nani-ka o, both "something (accusative case)."

Demonstratives
A series of demonstratives similar to modern Japanese's ko-so-a-do series (proximal-mesial-distal-interrogative) also exists in Hachijō:

Particles
Like Japanese, Hachijō makes extensive use of grammatical particles, which indicate a variety of meanings and grammatical functions. Most parts of speech can use some particles, but the majority of particles are used with nominals (nouns and pronouns). Hachijō's noun-marking particles are classified similarly to their Japanese counterparts into the following categories:

 , which mark items in lists.
 , which mark the grammatical cases of nominials. These are further divided into:
 , which indicate self-contained phrases such as the subject or object of a sentence.
 , which indicate phrases that are semantically linked to another part of the sentence, e.g., to express possession.
 , a broad category that is further divided into:
 , which emphasize, restrict, or otherwise indicate a kind of topic or focus related to the words they mark.
 , which turn words into adverbs of degree, extent, etc.

When multiple particles are used on the same noun, they are generally found in the order Adverbial → Case → Topic-Focus.

Enumerating particles
 are few in number, and they are used as conjunctions to join nominals into lists. The main particles of this type are to, ni, toka, da, and ja.

Both to and ni are used for making exhaustive lists, and are used more or less the same as in Japanese. The more usual way to form an exhaustive list is by using to, which is generally placed after every element of a list except the last (where it is optional):

The enumerating particle ni, on the other hand, is used in two main ways; the first use of ni emphasizes that the speaker is recalling the elements of the list, in which emphasized elements of the list are marked by ni and other elements left unmarked:

The second use of ni is found in binomial expressions such as mesini okazu 飯におかず "rice and a side dish". Unlike the case particle N~ni, the enumerating particle ni is not reduced to N after light syllables.

The particles toka, da, and ja, on the other hand, are used for making inexhaustive lists:

Case Particles
The most common standalone case particles are:

The smaller class of  particles is largely based around the genitive case (marked by ga or no) and compounds thereof:

Prominence Particles

The particles wa, mo, sika, made, and see do not affect the conjugation of a sentence's verb, while the focus particles ka & koo and the interrogative particle ka do affect it.

Finally, the following three particles affect the inflection of the subsequent verb:

 express adverbs of degree, extent, etc.

Particle Fusion
Some particles, particularly o~jo, i~jii, and N~ni, regularly undergo fusion with their host word:

In summary, words ending in light syllables undergo fusion with underlying *o, *i, and *N; whereas words ending in non-light syllables use the static longer forms jo, jii (Aogashima dialect rii), and ni.

In some older texts, the topic-marking particle wa (corresponding to Japanese は wa) can also be seen contracting with host nominals it follows (for example, ...ci + wa → ...cja), but most such contractions with wa have fallen out of use in the present day. Surviving exceptions generally involve the pronominal ending -re (see below) contracting with wa to make -ra or -rja, or the combination of wa with other particles like -ni-wa → -nja.

Verbals

Verbal chains
All Hachijō verbals (verbs and verbal adjectives) make use of a variety of suffixes to indicate the verb's grammatical and semantic function. Suffixes attach to a phonological base form called the stem, occasionally triggering minor allophony; this combination of a stem and various suffixes creates a verb chain, which is one polymorphemic word. Verbal suffixes can be broadly classified into derivations, endings, auxiliaries, extensions, and postfixes:

Verb derivations attach to the stem and create a longer verb stem to which further suffixes can attach. They can combine with each other, in the order (Stem →) Causative → Passive or Potential → Stative → Retrospective or Past Subjunctive.

Verbal endings are always mandatory, with each verb using one. Endings generally end verb chains, but there are certain suffixes (auxiliaries and extensions) that can restart the verb chain. Depending on the exact function of the ending, the resulting verb can be finite or non-finite.

Verbal auxiliaries are verbs or verblike forms that attach to the infinitive, forming serial verb constructions. Being verbals, they themselves take endings of their own, restarting the verb chain. Verbal extensions are similar to auxiliaries, but attaching to the final form (or a Japanese-style tense) instead.

Verbal postfixes are like auxiliaries and verbal extensions in that they attach verb endings to extend the verb chain, but are also like verbal endings in that they conclude a verb chain.

While most suffixes follow the above categories and combination rules, there are exceptions, such as nomiziisi "won't not drink," which contains two endings in a row: the negative infinitive -izu and the dubitative -isi.

Lastly, there are several particles that can attach to certain verb forms, usually the attributive, infinitive, or participle. These are considered to be clitics that attach themselves to verb chains, not part of the chain themselves:
 declarative particles -wa, -zja
 question particles -ka, -kaN, -ĭ, etc.
 conjunctional particles -Nte, -karanja, -ni, -de, -ga, -to, etc.
 case particles -i, -ni, -kara, -o, etc.

Conjugation classes
Due to sound changes and other historical developments, the conjugation patterns found in Eastern Old Japanese have separated into several more distinct patterns in Hachijō. The following list of conjugation classes is derived from Kaneda (2001):

 Class 1.1A Verbs — Strong Consonant-Stem, Participle Qte Consonant-stem verbs whose stem ends in a light syllable followed by k, t, r, or a strong w. It also includes the verb jowa "to say," whose stem is nominally *iw- but becomes j- when followed by a vowel. Class 1.1A verbs with stems in w all have only a single short syllable before the w; other w-stem verbs are of Class 1.1A.Examples: kakowa "write," katowa "win," torowa "take," kawowa "buy," macikowa "curse," jowowa "get drunk," butowa "hit," jowa "say."
 Class 1.1A-uw Verbs — Strong uw-Stem, Participle Qte Consonant-stem verbs whose stem ends in u followed by a mostly-strong w. They differ from Class 1.1A w-stem verbs only in the attributive and final forms (and derived forms), where uw-o and uw-u contract to uu. Like w-stem Class 1.1A verbs, this class consists of verbs that have only a single syllable before the w. Kaneda classifies these verbs as a special subclass of 1.1A verbs (subclass 1.1Aa), but they are separated here for clarity.Examples: nuuwa "sew," kuuwa "eat," suuwa "suck," juuwa "tie up."
 Class 1.1A Verbs — Weak w-Stem, Participle Qte Consonant-stem verbs whose stem ends in a light syllable followed by a weak w. They can be subclassified into 1.1Ab (stem-final uw-), 1.1Ac (stem-final ow-), and 1.1Ad (stem-final aw-). For some speakers, particularly in Downhill dialects, verbs that once followed this conjugation have been partly or completely converted to Class 1.1B by treating the stative stem (with -ar-) as a new base stem.Examples: (b) huruuwa "shake," sukuuwa "scoop"; (c) omouwa "think," irouwa "bully"; (d) cukouwa "use," warouwa "laugh," juwouwa "celebrate," -nouwa "(conjectural suffix)."
 Class 1.1B Verbs — Strong Consonant-Stem, Participle te Consonant-stem verbs whose stem ends in a heavy syllable followed by k, t, or r.Examples: kourowa "freeze," keerowa "go home," koorowa "change," kookowa "dry," cjoorowa "touch."
 Class 1.1C Verbs — Semi-Strong r-Stem, Participle Qte Consonant-stem verbs created from the stative suffix -ar- or another combination with the existence verb ar-, like the copula dara (from de + arowa). Non-verbal adjectives such as heta "unskilled, crude" also can be said to follow this conjugation, as they use the copula dara in order to describe nouns, e.g., hetadoo sito "an unskilled person." Kaneda classifies these verbs as a special class of 1.1A verbs, but they are separated here for clarity.Examples: dara "be (copula)," oora "be, exist," -(t)ara "(stative suffix)," -Nzjara "(Old-Type negative)."
 Class 1.2A Verbs — Strong Consonant-Stem, Participle Nde Consonant-stem verbs whose stem ends in a light syllable followed by m, b, g, or n.Examples: kamowa "eat," nomowa "drink," jemowa "smile," asubowa "play," marubowa "die," ojogowa "swim," kasjagowa "slant," cinowa "die."
 Class 1.2B Verbs — Strong Consonant-Stem, Participle de Consonant-stem verbs whose stem ends in a heavy syllable followed by m, b, or g.Examples: houmowa "contain," eemowa "walk," soogowa "clamor."
 Class 1.3A Verbs — Weak s-Stem, Short-Euphonic Consonant-stem verbs whose stem ends in a light syllable followed by a weak s; this s becomes a coalescing i in certain inflections. For some speakers, particularly in Uphill dialects, verbs that once followed this conjugation are now conjugated as class 1.3B partly or completely instead.Examples: dasowa "take out," watasowa "send across," modosowa "put back," nabusowa "hide."
 Class 1.3A Verbs — Weak s-Stem, Long-Euphonic Consonant-stem verbs whose stem ends in a heavy syllable followed by a weak s; this s becomes (non-coalescing) ii in certain inflections. For some speakers, particularly in Uphill dialects, verbs that once followed this conjugation are now conjugated as class 1.3B partly or completely instead.Examples: tousowa "put through," keesowa "give back," mousowa "say," moosowa "spin."
 Class 1.3B Verbs — Strong s-Stem (Non-Euphonic) Consonant-stem verbs whose stem ends in a light syllable followed by a strong s. It is unclear whether these verbs derive from regularization of Class 1.3A and 1.3A verbs by eliminating their euphony, or if they never had euphony to begin with.Examples: hesowa "push," kesowa "erase," kasowa "lend," josowa "quit." 
 Class 2 Verbs — Vowel-Stem Vowel-stem verbs. They can be subclassified into Class 2a (ending in i-), Class 2b (ending in e-), Class 2c (ending in ee-), and Class 2d (ending in ei-).Examples: kirowa "wear," jerowa "insert," keerowa "mix," jamerowa "suffer," meirowa "burn," oseirowa "teach," irowa "sit."
 Class 3 Verbs — Irregular Irregular verbs, which share a mix of features from Classes 1 and 2, as well as other irregularities.Examples: sjowa "do," (de)kurowa "come."
 Verbal Adjectives (VA) One of the two types of adjectives in Hachijō. Verbal adjectives follow an idiosyncratic conjugation pattern that is supplemented with forms in -kar- (conjugated as Class 1.1C).Examples: boukja "big," sjokja "known," hajakja "fast," toukja "far," takakja "high," nagakja "long."
 New-Type Negative A hybrid between the Class 1.1C and verbal adjective classes that is used to conjugate the New-Type Negative auxiliary verb. It has a highly variable stem form of -Nnak- ~ -Nnar- ~ -Nnakar-; how it inflects will be noted in the following subsections. It is used in the Downhill Dialects instead of the Old-Type Negative, which instead consists of the regular Class 1.1C auxiliary -Nzjara.Sole example: -Nnaka "(New-Type negative)."

A table summarizing some of the basic forms of each conjugation class is shown below:

Verbal Affixes

Attributive -o
The  is made by adding the suffix -o to the stems of Class 1 verbs, -ro to those of Class 2, and -ke to verbal adjectives'. For irregular verbs, sjowa becomes sjo, and kurowa becomes kuro. This form descends from the Eastern Old Japanese attributive form -o1 ~ *-uro1.

On its own, the attributive serves a similar function to an English relative clause, for defining or classifying nominals:

Unlike in Modern Japanese, clauses in Hachijō also can be nominalized directly using the attributive form of a verb (glossed as ). When nominalized in this way, the clause becomes a noun meaning "the act of ~ing", "the fact of ~ happening", "one who ~s", "that which is ~ed," etc., depending on context. Compare these near-identical constructions in Hachijō and Japanese, where Japanese requires the nominalization particle の no, but Hachijō does not:

This function of the attributive was also a feature of Japanese up until the early modern period, during which の no became used as a nominalization particle.

See also the section on mermaid constructions, which make ample use of the attributive form.

Declarative Particles -wa and -zja
For a slightly assertive or emphatic statement, the particle -zja can replace -wa. The particles wa and zja come from Old Japanese は pa and にては nite pa → dewa, respectively. The wa-declarative form serves as the dictionary form of verbals.

Originally, these particles followed the Old Japanese attributive in its nominalized form, creating a topicalized nominal; in Hachijō, they have become markers of independent clauses, almost completely supplanting the original final form in this particular use:

With verbal adjectives, the attributive -ke merges with -wa to become -kja:

Verbs of Class 1.1C also merge their attributive with -wa, contracting -owa irregularly to -a. For instance, the copula dara has the attributive form *dar-o → doo, but this is blocked by the addition of -wa, as -owa contracts to -a instead, viz., *dar-o-wa → dara.

A similar variation can be seen in the New Negative, which has the attributive form *-Nnako → -Nnoo but a declarative form *-Nnakowa → -Nnaka.

The declarative particle zja has no special contracted forms, always attaching directly to the attributive, e.g., nomozja "drinks," doozja "is." It has also been noted to take the form -zjaN in the Sueyoshi dialect.

Other particles used with the attributive
Because of its nominalization function, the attributive form can be followed by any particle that can follow a noun, such as case particles. However, in addition, there are several other particles can also attach particularly to the attributive forms of verbals:

The clitic -Nte is a shortened form of -joNte, itself an extreme contraction and metathesis of -ni joQte, related to Japanese ～によって ni yotte "due to, by means of." This clitic has significant variance between dialects when it occurs after long vowels, shown here on ikowa "to go" as an example:

Some speakers of the Nakanogō and Kashitate dialects were also noted to have used the older form -joNte  after both long and short vowels as late as 1950.

Infinitive -i
The  is made by adding the suffix -i to the stems of Class 1 verbs, nothing to those of Class 2, and -ku to verbal adjectives'. For irregular verbs, sjowa becomes si, and kurowa becomes ki. This form descends from the Old Japanese infinitive -i1. Negative verbs also have a suppletive infinitive form where the whole negative auxiliary -Nnaka or -Nzjara is replaced by -zu, from Old Japanese -zu ← -ni su (possibly reborrowed through Japanese).

This is a non-finite form used similarly to Japanese's infinitive: to link several verbs in a clause, for serial verb constructions, attaching auxiliary verbs, as a method of nominalizing verbs, etc.

Infinitive as an Independent Predicate
Certain independent predicates can make use of the infinitive form instead of an ordinary finite predicate.

Simple infinitive predicates can be used to refer to actions in the immediate past, or to indicate that the speaker is speaking to themself, or both:

In a reduplicated form with -mo "also, even," specifically of the form nomimo nomi (for nomowa "to drink"), infinitive predicates are used to assert of the truth of the speaker's statement. This kind of statement is used without regard to time:

Another use of an infinitive predicate can be found in certain types of questions, as discussed in a section below.

Infinitive-Derived Expressions
A number of auxiliary verbs can be used with the infinitive, all of which are derived from grammaticalized verbs:

The negative verbal auxiliaries -Nnaka and -Nzjara, discussed in a later subsection, are also attached to the infinitive.

Similarly, there are a number of derived adjectives or adjective-like expressions built on the infinitive form:

And several conjunctional forms as well:

 reduplicated (e.g., nominomi) — Indicates that an action is iterative. Used by itself, it serves as an adverbial phrase indicating that the iterative action was performed simultaneously with another, whereas when used with sjowa "to do" (e.g., nominomi sjowa), it simply indicates repeated action. Reduplicated verbs do not undergo vowel coalescence, e.g., okoriokori "happening again and again," not **okorjokori.
 -nagara ~ -nagaa — Indicates that an action is performed simultaneously with another, e.g. nominagara "while drinking." This formation is synonymous with the simultaneous gerund in -outei. Cognate with Japanese ～ながら -nagara.
 -gacu ~ -gacura — Indicates that an action is performed simultaneously with another, often coincidentally or through the exact same action, e.g. nomigacu "while one happens to be drinking." This form is limited to verbs that involve agency on the subject's part, and is also not usually used with motion verbs without an implicit endpoint (e.g., eemowa "walk," hasirowa "run"), intransitive bodily activities or functions (e.g. tatowa "stand"), or transitive verbs where an action is performed only once to one object (e.g., sasagowa "put on one's head"). Related to Japanese ～がてら -gatera.
 -i (allative) or -ni (dative) — Indicates the purpose for which another action was performed, e.g. nomii or nomini "in order to drink." Using the allative -i is the more common than the dative -ni for this purpose, but both can be found.

Negative Infinitive -zu
The negative infinitive can be made in two different ways. The first way is by simply appending -zu to the regular infinitive form, e.g., nomizu "not drinking" (but is treated here as its own suffix). The second way is by adding -azu to the stems of Class 1 verbs, and -zu to those of Class 2. In this latter way, for irregular verbs, sjowa becomes sazu, sjazu, or sezu; and kurowa becomes kozu.

The negative infinitive is used in many of the same situations that the regular infinitive is used word-finally (that is, without any suffixes). However, there are some specialized constructions used with -zu:

 -zuN ~ -zuni (-zu-ni), which acts as an adverbial phrase meaning "without ~ing," e.g., nomazuN "without drinking." It can also be used with a similar meaning to a negative participle.
 -zunja (-zu-nja), which acts as an adjectival noun and expresses necessity, e.g., nomazunjadara "must drink, have to drink." This form likely originally meant "if one does not ~," to be followed by a phrase such as damedara "it would not be good," but only the copula dara has remained. Compare Japanese ～なきゃ -nakya, ～なくちゃ -nakucha, and ～ないと -nai to, which literally mean "if one does not," but can express a necessitative meaning even without a following clause.

In addition, there are a handful of derived forms from -zu:

 Negative Participle -zuto, used for conjunctive constructions with the particle -mo "even," e.g., nomazutomo "even not drinking, even if he doesn't drink." In general, this competes as the negative participle with -Nsjade and the dative-marked -zuN ~ -zuni.
 Negative Dubitative -ziisi (-zu-isi), used as a kind of double negative to show what is not doubted, etc. (e.g., nomiziisi "won't not drink"). This competes with the regularly-formed -Nnakaroosi and Nzjaroosi, formed from the negative auxiliaries -Nnaka and -Nzjara.
 Non-Intentional -ziimadouwa (-zu-imadow-, -try), a derived Class 1.1Ac verb that expresses a lack of trying to do something, or seeming not to do something, e.g., nomaziimadouwa "doesn't try to drink." This appears to be a compound involving the verb 惑う madouwa "to get lost, to be perplexed."

Participle -te
The  is made by adding the suffix -te or -de to the stems of Class 1 (with some allomorphy), -te to those of Class 2, and -kute to verbal adjectives'. For irregular verbs, sjowa becomes site, and kurowa becomes kite. This grammatical form and its cognates across the Japonic languages are known by many names, including "participle," "gerund," "continuative," "subordinating," and simply "te-form"; the term "participle" will be used here. This form descends from the Old Japanese subordinating suffix -te, which was historically added to the infinitive but has gained a great degree of allomorphy due to historical sound changes, so it is treated as its own suffix here.

The participle is a non-finite form that serves a coordinating or subordinating role in sentences, indicating the realization (at the very least, the beginning) of the marked action. Therefore, the clause following a participle must necessarily refer to either the same time or a later time:

Due to the temporal ordering implied by the participle, it can be used to imply a causal relationship:

Lastly, the participle can also be used to mark mirativity or emphasis in verbs of sensation or emotion:

Participle-Derived Expressions
The participle has a few specialized uses when combined with certain particles:

Several verbs are also used in common constructions with the participle:

Anterior -toQtei
The  can be made by replacing the -te or -de of the participle with -totei ~ -toQtei or -dotei ~ -doQtei, respectively. The form -toQtei ~ doQtei is older, and is now generally used after verbs without euphonic participles (mostly Class 2 and 3 verbs, as well as verbal adjectives), whereas -totei ~ -dotei is used with other verbs (like Class 1 verbs). The copula dara has the anterior gerund doQtei.

There are two likely candidates for this form's etymology:

 participle -te + participle oQte of or- "to be" + accusative -o (in mirative usage)
 participle -te + participle oQte of ok- "to put" + accusative -o (in mirative usage)

This form denotes an action that occurs strictly before another action that occurs in the following clause. It is similar but not exactly equivalent to the construction -tekara ~ -dekara, using the participle -te ~ -de and the ablative -kara.

Requisitional -tou
The  form can be made by replacing the -te or -de of the participle with -tou or -dou, respectively. This suffix is often thought to etymologically derive from the participle -te followed by the accusative -o, but as that would have been expected to yield **-tei rather than -tou, this form's ultimate origin is unclear; it likely derives from a more complex contraction.

The requisitional is used for asking favors and requests of others. Like the imperative, it can be softened by adding mii afterward:

Imperative -e ~ -ro
The  is made by adding the suffix -e to the stems of Class 1 verbs, and -ro to those of Class 2. For irregular verbs, sjowa becomes se or sje, and kurowa becomes ko. These forms descend from the Eastern Old Japanese imperative forms -e(1) ~ ro2.

The imperative is used for commands, and can be softened by adding mii afterward:

The imperative can also be used to warn others about imminent events that would have a negative effect on them:

For negative imperatives, the prohibitive postfix -na (attaching to the final form) is used instead.

Final Form -u
The  is made by adding the suffix -u to the stems of Class 1 verbs, nothing or -ru to those of Class 2, and -ke or underlying *-karu to verbal adjectives'. For irregular verbs, sjowa becomes su, and kurowa becomes ku or kuru. However, for Class 1.1C verbs, the underlying *-aru typically contracts to aQ, aN, or oo depending on the following morpheme; the same can be said for verbal adjectives, whose underlying 1.1C *-karu contracts to -kaQ, -kaN, or -koo. This form descends from the Old Japanese final form -u, as well as in some constructions borrowed from Japanese using its attributive form -u ~ -ru.

Despite its name, this suffix's use in concluding declarative sentences has mostly been supplanted in Hachijō by the declarative -owa form. It mainly only exists as a predicative form in quotative and reportative speech:

However, the final form still remains fossilized in the formation of several verbal extensions:

Prohibitive -na
The  is made by adding the suffix -na to the final form (with or without the extra -ru on Class 2 verbs and kurowa). This form is either inherited from the Old Japanese prohibitive -(u)na or reborrowed from Japanese. This form serves as the negative counterpart to the imperative, commanding the addressee not to do something:

Conjectural Extension -naw-
The  extension is made by adding -naw- (Class 1.1A) to the final forms of verbals. On Class 2 verbs and kurowa, the extra ru is optional; for verbal adjectives, the combined result is -kaNnaw-. This extension descends from the Old Japanese tentative-conjectural extension -nam- (contrast Western Old Japanese -uram-), with /m/ elided to /w/.

This extension denotes various conjectural meanings such as guessing, expectation, prediction, hypotheticality, and other such irrealis situations.

Focalizing Extension -naw-
The  extension is made by adding -naw- (Class 1.1A) to the final forms of verbals, identical in all forms to the conjectural.

This extension was borrowed from a Middle Japanese mermaid construction -(r)u nari, consisting of the Middle Japanese nominalized attributive form in -(r)u followed by the copula なり nari, an exact parallel to Hachijō's native -(r)odara mermaid construction. Because the Middle Japanese attributive is -(r)u rather than -(r)o, this construction was borrowed to use the Hachijō final form in -(r)u instead. In addition, the borrowed copula nar- has been reduced to -naw-, merging in form with the conjectural -naw-.

The Japanese-style present form -nou (← -naw-u) is used sentence-finally for emphasis (example 1) and sentence-medially express cause and effect (example 2):

The exclamatory form -nee (← -naw-e) is used in kakari-musubi with the focus particle koo (see the section on focalized exclamatory kakari-musubi for details and examples).

The provisional form -neeja (← -naw-eba) is used to express two types of conditionals or cause-and-effect statements. When not following the stative extension, it is an imperfect conditional, indicating that the condition was met repeatedly or many times at once:

When -neeja does follow the stative extension, the clauses expresses a completed action, and the following clause indicates a result that occurred upon its completion:

Lastly, this extension appears to be somehow fossilized in the optative ending -osunou.

Jussive Adjective -beki
The  is made by adding the postfix -beki to the final forms of verbs, creating an adjectival noun. This form is borrowed from the Japanese form -beki, descended from Western Old Japanese -(u)be2-ki1.

This form acts as an adjectival noun that, when used with the copula dara, expresses a meaning like "ought to do," "should do," or "needs to do":

A verbal adjective form -bekja of this affix has also been attested.

Suppositional Adjective -rasikja
The  form is made by adding the extension -rasi- to the final forms of verbs, creating a verbal adjective. This form is either inherited from Eastern Old Japanese -(u)rasi or borrowed from its Japanese cognate form ～らしい -rashi-i.

This form is a verbal adjective with the meaning "seeming":

Conditional Gerund -aba
The  is made by adding the suffix -aba to the stems of Class 1 verbs, -ba or -raba to those of Class 2, and -kaba or -kaaba ~ -karaba to verbal adjectives'. For irregular verbs, sjowa becomes saba, and kurowa becomes koba or kuraba. This form descends from the Old Japanese conditional gerund -aba.

This form introduces a condition or prerequisite that, if it is (or were) true, the following clause occurs (or would occur). For conditions without a stative, the consequence occurs before the condition (in anticipation of it):

For past conditions (usually marked with a stative), the consequence occurs after the achievement of the condition:

Finally, if the consequence refers to past time, the sentence is always counterfactual, where the condition was not actually met:

Futile-Hypothetical Gerund -jaatei
The  is made by adding the suffix -jaatei to the stems of Class 1 verbs, -rjaatei to those of Class 2, and -kjaatei or -karjaatei to verbal adjectives'. For irregular verbs, sjowa becomes sjaatei, and kurowa becomes kurjaatei. This form is believed to descend from the Class 1 infinitive -i followed by the phrase aQte mo "even if it is": *-iaQtemo → *-jaQtewo → *-jaatei; the other verb classes' forms must have been formed by analogy.

This form expresses futility: the clause marked by -jaatei introduces a condition that is known to be false or impossible, and the following clause expresses an action or state that would remain true even if the condition were met.

Exclamatory -e
The  is made by adding the suffix -e to the stems of Class 1 verbs, -re to those of Class 2, and -ke to verbal adjectives'. For irregular verbs, sjowa becomes se or sje, and kurowa becomes kure. This form descends from the Old Japanese exclamatory form -e2 ~ -ure.

The exclamatory form used as a predicative form in constructions with the focus particles ka and koo; these constructions are detailed further in the section on kakari-musubi. The exclamatory form is also used etymologically as the base for forming the provisional and concessive gerunds, detailed in the following subsection:

Provisional -eba ~ -ja
The  is generally formed by adding by the suffix -ba or -a to the exclamatory form of verbals (but is treated as its own suffix). For the -a variant, this contracts with a preceding e to become ja, or if the verb's exclamatory form ends in a long vowel, -a becomes -ja instead (e.g., wareeba → wareeja "when he laughs"). For verbal adjectives, the -ba forms are -keba and -kereba, while the -a form is -kerja. For the irregular verb sjowa, the -ba forms are sureba and s(j)eba, and the -a forms are surja and sja. For the irregular verb kurowa, the -ba form is kureba, and the -a form is -kurja. All of these forms descend from the Old Japanese conjunctive gerund  -e2ba ~ -ureba with or without the /b/ elided. Although the variants in -eba and -ja have identical etymologies, they have slightly diverged in usage.

The principal function of the provisional gerund is to mark a subordinate clause that is causally or temporally related to the main clause, describing the circumstance in which the main clause occurs:

Both -eba and -ja can also be used to mark future conditions, whether they are expected to be actualized or not:

However, for conditions or circumstances that are or were met repeatedly, with the same result in each case, -ja is preferred for both present and past results:

When used with a focus-marking particle ka or koo, a provisional in -ja marks a precise reason, with more emphasis than the common phrasing using -Nte "because." Naturally, such sentences with ka or koo use exclamatory kakari-musubi:

Concessive -edou
The  is formed by adding by the suffix -dou to the exclamatory form of verbals (but is treated as its own suffix). For Class 1.1C verbs, the resulting sequence -aredou can contract to -aĭdou. This form descends from the Old Japanese concessive gerund  -e2do2mo2 ~ -uredo2mo2 → -edowo ~ -redowo → -edou ~ -redou, cognate to the Japanese conjunctions けども kedomo and けれども keredomo "although." The forms -doumo and -douni are also attested.

The concessive gerund introduces adverse information despite which the main clause still nevertheless occurs or occurred:

Volitional -ou
The  is made by adding the suffix -ou to the stems of Class 1 verbs, and -rou to those of Class 2. Alternative formations also exist, where Class 1.1A verbs use their declarative or final form, -i (possibly underlying *o or *u) is attached to the stems of Class 2b verbs, and nothing is added to the stems of Classes 2c and 2d. For irregular verbs, sjowa becomes sjou, and kurowa becomes kurou or kou. (Verbal adjectives have no volitional form.) The volitional seems to have some relationship to the Old Japanese tentative-conjectural form -am-, and thereby the Japanese volitional -ō ~ -yō, but the exact path between the Old Japanese and Modern Hachijō forms is not clear.

The volitional indicates a personal intent or a cohortative suggestion:

Statements of intent can be emphasized by adding the postfix -bei, as in nomoubei "I'll drink!" Similarly, cohortative suggestions can be emphasized by adding the declarative particle -zja, as in ikouzja "Let's go!"

The volitional can also be used as an attributive form in the construction -ou houdara and its negative equivalent -ou hou nakja, which indicate ability or possibility:

Simultaneous -outei
The  can be made by appending -tei to the end of the volitional form. There are two likely candidates for this form's etymology:

 volitional -ou + quotative te + accusative -o (in mirative usage)
 volitional -ou + quotative to + allative -i

This form denotes an action that occurs simultaneously with another action, similar to English "while ~ing," and equivalent in meaning to adding -nagara "while" to the infinitive.

This sense of simultaneity can also be used to indicate an action that was interrupted by another:

It can also be used to emphasize a contradictory yet simultaneous event:

Dubitative-Related Forms
Several verbal forms appear to be related to the dubitative (formerly optative) form listed below, which seems to be related in some way to the Classical Japanese optative constructions ～ま欲しき -mafosi-ki or ～ま欲りする -mafori suru.

Dubitative -oosi
The  form is made by adding the suffix -oosi to the stems of Class 1 verbs (or -aroosi for Class 1.1A), -isi or -roosi to those of Class 2a and 2b, -si or -roosi to those of Class 2c and 2d, and -karoosi to verbal adjectives'. For irregular verbs, sjowa becomes seisi or sjoosi, and kurowa becomes kousi or kuroosi. The Sueyoshi and Aogashima dialects are an exception, where -iisi is used for Class 1 verbs (-ariisi for Class 1.1A), only -isi ~ -si is used for Class 2, sjowa becomes siisi, and kurowa becomes kiisi.

As attested in older records, this form once expressed an optative meaning, often (but not necessarily) regarding a wish or hope that the speaker thinks might not come true:

 
However, due to semantic shift emphasizing the non-realization of the wish, this form has changed to have an ironic, doubting, or generally negative meaning in modern speech. When used with a first-person subject, it expresses what the speaker does not want to do, cannot do, or does not believe he or she can do. When used with non-first-person subjects, it expresses what the speaker expects is not the case or will not happen.
 

The dubitative can also attach to the negative infinitive -zu to form -ziisi, which—due to its double negative-like meaning—indicates what the speaker thinks should be possible or doesn't doubt will happen.

This is identical in meaning to the forms -Nnakaroosi and Nzjaroosi, which use the negative auxiliaries -Nnaka and -Nzjara.

Optative -oosunou
The  form is made by replacing the -si of the dubitative form with -sunou (but is treated as its own suffix). This form appears to consist of the dubitative followed by the focalizing extension -naw- in its Japanese-style present form -nou.

Like the older use of -osi, -osunou expresses an optative meaning, often regarding a wish or hope that the speaker thinks might not come true. Kaneda (2001) notes that the older meaning of optative -osi and the modern meaning of -osunou are largely the same with subtle differences, but does not elaborate further.

Intentional -oosjaate
The  gerund is made by replacing the -si of the dubitative form with -sjaate (but is treated as its own suffix).

This form is generally indicate that an action is attempted, considered, to planned to be done:

The intentional is often used in conjunction with the verb sjowa "to do." With agentive verbs, this construction means "to attempt to, to plan to," etc., whereas with non-agentive verbs, it instead means "to seem to be about to":

Past Subjunctive -oositar-
The  is made by replacing the -si of the dubitative form with -sitara (but is treated as its own suffix), which is conjugated as a Class 1.1C verb (stem -sitar-). This form appears to etymologically consist of the dubitative followed by the stative suffix -tar-.

This form is used to mark actions that would have occurred in different circumstances, but were not (or could not be) actualized:

Japanese-Style Forms
All of these forms have been borrowed directly from Modern or Late Middle Japanese, but are nativized to lesser or greater extent. In many constructions, Japanese-style tenses are capable of replacing final and/or attributive forms. Generally, the Japanese-style present and Japanese-style past are equivalent to Hachijō-style forms with and without the stative suffix -(t)ar-, respectively.

Present -u
The affirmative  is made by adding the suffix -u to the stems of Class 1 verbs, -ru to those of Class 2, and a coalescing -i to verbal adjectives'. For irregular verbs, sjowa becomes su or suru, and kurowa becomes ku or kuru. The copula dara also has the irregular form da.The negative Japanese-style present has two forms; the first is made by changing the New-Type Negative auxiliary -Nnaka to -Nnee, while the second is formed by changing the -ba of the conditional gerund -aba to -nee.

Past -ta
The affirmative  is made by changing the -te or -de of verbs' participles to -ta or -da, respectively, and by adding -kaQta to verbal adjectives' stems. For verbs, this can be further extended by adding another -Qta to the end, with a meaning akin to adding a second past -(t)ar- to a verb.The negative Japanese-style past is made by changing the New-Type Negative auxiliary -Nnaka of the negative Japanese-style present tense to -NnaQta.

Despite being a Japanese-borrowed form, Class 1 verbs still exhibit Hachijō-style euphony as in the participle form; for example, the Japanese-style past form of togowa "to grind, polish" (stem tog-) is toNda, not **toida.

Presumptive -darou ~ -rou
The Japanese-style  forms are made by appending -darou to Japanese-style present tense verbals, or -rou to Japanese-style past tense verbals. On verbs, the negative present presumptive also has a suppletive form where -mee is appended to the final form. These forms were borrowed from the Japanese presumptive particle だろう darō (a combination of the copula だ da and suffix ～ろう -rō) and the suffixes ～ろう -rō and ～まい -mai. The latter are descended from the Early Middle Japanese suffixes ～らむ -ramu ~ -raũ and ～まじ -mazi.

This form is generally equivalent in meaning to the native Hachijō conjectural extension -naw-.

Representative -tari
The Japanese-style  gerund is made by adding -ri or -ĭ to the Japanese-style past tense (but is treated as its own suffix). This creates a gerund meaning "activities such as ~ing," and it is often used in non-exhaustive lists of activities. These forms were borrowed from the equivalent Japanese forms -tari ~ -dari.

This gerund is usually paired with a verb of doing usually sjowa "to do" (but also occasionally, others, such as simouwa "to finish doing"):

The auxiliary verb -mik- differs in that it cannot mark lists of activities, only a single activity.

Verbal Adjective Nominalizers -sa and -mi
Two unique ways to change verbal adjectives into nouns is by using the affixes -sa and -mi (both ), both of which are attached directly to the verbal adjective stem. Unlike in Japanese, Hachijō -mi is synonymous with -sa and indicates a noun of extent or quantity, comparable to English -ness:

The suffix -mi can only be used with a select number of verbal adjectives, whereas -sa can be used with all verbal adjectives.

Negative
There are a variety of ways to form  verbs—that is, verbs with the meaning "not" included—in Hachijō. The primary ways are with auxiliary verbs, of which Hachijō has two: the "Old-Type" -Nzjara and the "New-Type" -Nnaka. It has been said that the Old-Type is typical of the Uphill region of Hachijō-jima (in the Kashitate, Nakanogō, and Sueyoshi dialects), whereas the New-Type is typical of the Downhill region (Mitsune and Ōkagō dialects); however, the New-Type has spread to be used among all younger generations of speakers. Verbal adjectives and the copula do not use either of these negative auxiliaries. Instead, verbal adjectives use their infinitive form in -ku followed by the verbal adjective nakja "not"; similarly, the copula uses zja nakja—the participle form de fused with the topic marker -wa, followed by nakja.

Old-Type Negative -Nzjara
The  is formed by adding the auxiliary verb -Nzjara (stem -Nzjar-, Class 1.1C) to a verb's infinitive form. If the verb's infinitive ends in a long vowel, the first N of this auxiliary is dropped.

It is speculated that -Nzjar- may come from an unattested Eastern Old Japanese construction *-ni si ar- "is not doing," composed the negative infinitive -(a)ni, infinitive si of s- "to do," and ar- "to be." This would be akin to how early Old Japanese -ni su yielded later -zu "does not."

New-Type Negative -Nnaka
The  is formed by adding the auxiliary verb -Nnaka (stem -Nnak- ~ -Nnar- ~ -Nnakar-, special conjugation class) to a verb's infinitive form. If the verb's infinitive ends in a long vowel, the first N of this auxiliary is dropped. It is speculated that the New-Type negative is based on replacing the zjara of the Old-Type negative -Nzjara with the adjective nakja "not," then reanalyzing it as something akin to a Class 1.1C verb. This would explain the alternating verb stems:

 -Nnakar- would be the regular derived Class 1.1C verb stem of *-Nnakja: *-Nna-ku ar- → -Nnakar-.
 -Nnak- would be from changing *-Nnakja to a verb *-Nnakowa → -Nnaka.
 -Nnar- would be from replacing the zj of -Nzjara with n by analogy: -Nzjar- → -Nnar-.

As this auxiliary is highly irregular, a sample of conjugated forms is given in the table below:

Other Negative Forms
In addition to the negative auxiliaries, there are also several other verbal affixes that indicate negative meaning:

 Negative Infinitive -zu, and all of its derived forms.
 Prohibitive -na, a postfix following the final form, which serves as the negative counterpart to the imperative.
 Japanese-style Negative Present -anee, which is one of the Japanese-style counterparts to the normal present tense. It can be formed by replacing the -zu of the -azu form of the negative infinitive with -nee, e.g., nomanee "doesn't drink."
 Japanese-style Negative Present Presumptive -mee, a postfix following the final form, which serves as the negative counterpart to -darou.

Stative -ar- ~ -tar-
The  derivation is made by adding -ar- to the stems of Class 1.1 and 1.2 verbs, -(i)tar- to those of Class 1.3 (with some allomorphy),  -tar- to those of Class 2, and -karar- to verbal adjectives'. For irregular verbs, sjowa becomes sitar-, and kurowa becomes kitar-. All stative forms are conjugated as Class 1.1C verbs. The allomorph -ar- descends from the Eastern Old Japanese stative-progressive -ar-, itself a construction from the Pre-Old Japanese infinitive *-i + ar- "to be"; it is therefore cognate to Western Old Japanese -e1r- and Middle Japanese -er- of the same original meaning (extinct in Modern Japanese). The allomorphs containing -tar- instead descend from the Old Japanese stative-progressive -tar-, consisting of participle -te + ar- "to be"; it is therefore cognate to the Modern Japanese past tense -ta.

Although originally indicating stative-like meaning, and continuing to do so in some situations, this extension has changed to a meaning close to a past tense in modern Hachijō, supplanting the former past tense (now retrospective) -ci in most cases.

Due to heavy influence from Japanese, for some speakers, forms with the morph -ar- are in the process of being replaced with forms in -tar- ~ -dar- (formed in the same way as the participle -te ~ -de): nomara → noNdara "drank," ikara → iQtara "went," curara → cuQtara "fished."

Retrospective -ci
The  is made by replacing the -te or -de of the participle with -ci or -zi, respectively. It is often used in combination with the stative -(t)ar-, as -(t)aQci, to express more or less the same meaning. The retrospective can also combine with the Japanese-style past -ta to form -taQci, or with both the Japanese-style past -ta and the stative -ar- to form -taraQci.

This form descends from the attributive form -si of the Old Japanese past tense auxiliary -ki1. It is believed to have been changed from -si to -ci by morphological leveling due to Class 1.1A verbs' stem-final Q, as per the phonological process Q-s → Qc.

This extension indicates past tense, as well as often indicating a modal meaning of retrospection or recollection. Although it does not inflect per se, -ci can be treated as an attributive, exclamatory, or final form. As an attributive form, it can be used in all normal attributive-form functions:

However, the declarative form with -wa is irregular, becoming -cii ~ -zii:

As a final form, -ci combines with the focalized exclamatory -nee for kakari-musubi with the focus particle koo. Such sentences are used to emphatically remind others of past events that they have forgotten:

Lastly, as an exclamatory-type form, -ci can serve as the base for the concessive gerund -dou:

This affix is falling out of use, having mostly been supplanted in meaning by the stative, which has transitioned into a past-like meaning. However, it still contrasts with the stative in that the retrospective requires an action to have occurred significantly in the past. For example, sentence 8 is acceptable, whereas sentence 9 is not:

Because the person in the above examples still remains present in when the sentence is uttered, the action of "arriving" is not significantly past enough for the retrospective (in 9) to be appropriate, but the simple stative (in 8) is acceptable.

Passive -(r)are-
The  extension is made by adding the suffix -are- to the stems of Class 1 verbs, and -rare- to those of Class 2. For irregular verbs, sjowa becomes sare-, and kurowa becomes korare-. All passive forms are conjugated as Class 2b verbs.

The primary function of the passive is to denote an action that occurs without the intent or volition of the subject of the sentence. In this usage, the recipient or "affected party" of the action becomes the subject (marked as a topic or in nominative case, or omitted), and any agent is marked in the dative case with N~ni:

A specialized use of this is to form passive sentences. In some situations, these can be interpreted as a direct passive similar to English's, where the former direct object becomes the new subject of the sentence as the "affected party":

In other situations, the "affected party" is not the former direct object, creating passive sentences that often cannot be directly translated with the English passive voice. As Hachijō is a pro-drop language, the "sufferer" can also be omitted:

Another use of the passive extension is to express potentiality, that is, meanings such as an individual's ability, a general ability for anyone, a possible state, and past achievement:

In a negative sentence, this potential meaning can also be used deontically to indicate a necessity:

Potential -e-
The  extension is a specialized alternative to the passive extension that exists for Class 1 verbs and the irregular verb kurowa. It is made by adding the suffix -e- to the stems of Class 1 verbs, and kurowa becomes kore-. Like the passive, all potential forms are conjugated as Class 2b verbs.

Like the passive, the potential can also denote certain kinds of spontaneous actions (but not the passive):

However, the potential extension's primary function is to indicate potentiality, much like one of the functions of the passive extension:

Causative -(s)ase-
The  extension is made by adding the suffix -ase- to the stems of Class 1 verbs, and -sase- to those of Class 2. For irregular verbs, sjowa becomes sase-, and kurowa becomes kosase-. In these forms, causatives are conjugated as Class 2b verbs. Especially in the Downhill Dialects, the ase found in this form can be reduced to ee by dropping of the s; in these forms, causatives are conjugated as Class 2c verbs.

This extension is used to form causative constructions, increasing a verb's valency by 1 to include a causer agent. The old subject becomes a new indirect object (in dative case), and the causer becomes the new subject (as a topic or in nominative case). This function can indicate direct causation (such as by a command) or indirect causation (such as by giving permission, or by allowing something to happen through inaction). 

In forms where ase is elided to ee and then inflected into its participle form, the -te that marks the participle can be dropped, much like Class 1.3A and 1.3A verbs:

Syntax
Like Japanese, Hachijō is head-final, left-branching, topic-prominent, often omits nouns that can be understood from context, and has default subject–object–verb word order. Nouns exhibit neither grammatical gender nor number.

Quotations and Reported Speech
Quotations and reported speech, both direct and indirect, are fundamentally marked by the quotative particle -to, which follows the quoted speech.

The quotative particle is often followed by a verb of speaking or thinking, typically jowa "say" and omouwa "think," respectively. Due to vowel coalescence, -to often becomes -te when followed by jowa (underlying stem iw-). Similarly, the sequence -to omow- is usually trimmed to -to mow- by haplology. 

In addition, certain forms of -te jowa often contract to make an irregular defective verb -teija (stem *-tew-, .say). This verb has the following forms:

 attributive + wa-declarative: teija (or teiwa in the Aogashima dialect) ← *te jo-wa
 attributive + "because": teite ← *te jo-Nte
 attributive + copular participle de: teide ← *te jo-de
 participle: teQte ← *tew-te ← te iQte

Any other forms are made periphrastically using the non-contracted to jowa ~ te jowa.

Except in exact quotations, verbs followed by the quotative particle generally use the final form (or a Japanese-style tense) in place of a wa-declarative form; the use of the final form in this construction is either fossilized from Old Japanese or influenced by mainland Japanese. Words followed by the quotative particle have a tendency to have their final syllable altered slightly:

 a Q can be inserted: nomu "drinks" + -teija → nomuQteija "it is said that he drinks"
 the vowel can be lengthened: wareenaka "won't laugh" + -te → wareenakaate "won't laugh" (direct quote)
 for Class 1.1C verbs (and verbal adjectives), -ru contracts to Q: *jokaru "is good" + -teite → jokaQteite "because they say it is good"

Kakari-Musubi
 is a grammatical phenomenon found in most Japonic languages where certain particles on nouns in a sentence influence the form that a sentence's verb takes. In Hachijō, it involves the change of a sentence-final verb from an expected declarative form (in -owa) to either the attributive or exclamatory form. Hachijō's kakari-musubi can be triggered by the use of the focus particles ka and koo, or by making a sentence into a question.

Interrogative kakari-musubi
This type of kakari-musubi surfaces in questions and in statements of wondering. Such a sentence will use the bare  for its main verb rather than a declarative form in -wa or -zja, for example. Effectively, this means that the declarative particle is dropped.

For examples and further information on forming questions, see the subsection on interrogative sentences.

Exclamatory kakari-musubi
This construction is inherited from Old Japanese, possibly even Proto-Japonic.

If the clause containing ka is used in a mermaid construction, then the following copula uses the exclamatory form instead:

Focalized Exclamatory kakari-musubi
This type of kakari-musubi uses the focalizing suffix -naw- in its exclamatory form -nee, which always links to the particle -koo:

Like ordinary exclamatory kakari-musubi, if the clause containing koo is used in a mermaid construction, then the following copula takes the focalizing exclamatory -nee:

Interrogative Sentences
For these types of sentences, it is not unheard of for the final vowel of the sentences to become lengthened if it is short i, u, or a.

Polar Questions

A specific kind of polar question can be marked instead by the sentence-final particle -kaN, a descendant of Old Japanese かも kamo2. In the Mitsune dialect, these questions indicate that the speaker is recalling or trying to recall information as he or she is asking about it; in the Sueyoshi dialect, -kaN is the general marker for polar questions instead of -ka.

Nonpolar Questions
Occasionally, a non-coalescing -ĭ can be heard attached to the end of the sentence:

Infinitive Questions
Certain questions are asked using the infinitive rather than the attributive. These questions ask for definitive answers about an action or event that began in the past, regardless of whether it has ended by the present time:

Indirect Questions
General expressions of guessing, contemplation, or wondering on the part of the speaker are usually expressed with the conjectural extension -naw- in its attributive form -nou. The element of the sentence that the speaker is wondering about is marked with the question marker ka.

The same form with -nou can also be used to express anger or exasperation:

Japanese-style Questions
Japanese-style tenses can be used without ka for all kinds of questions, occasionally using a non-coalescing suffix -ĭ as well. These sentences can, but do not necessarily, imply a meaning of asking whether the listener shares the same volition or opinion as the speaker.

Japanese-style tenses can also be combined with the postfixes -darou or -rou (both also borrowed from Japanese) to express a presumptive, confirming, or conjectural question:

The Japanese-style present tense can be followed by ka to ask whether the listener shares the same volition or opinion as the speaker:

Finally, Japanese-style tenses (with or without the presumptive darou ~ -rou) can be used with ka and the discourse particle noo to express wondering (see also example 8 above):

Mermaid Constructions
Mermaid constructions, which are found across Japonic and in several other East Asian language families, are also found in Hachijō.

 -(r)odara 

This construction -(r)odara consists of a nominalized attributive verb followed by the copula dara, roughly translatable as "to be the case that ~." It is considered a mermaid construction because the nominalized attributive can also be analyzed as the normal attributive followed by an enclitic null noun.

This construction serves multiple uses in Hachijō, similar to its Japanese counterpart ～のだ no da; for example, it can mark a phrase as being explanatory (ex. 1), hortative (ex. 2), or something the speaker wishes to emphasize (ex. 3):

When the copula in this mermaid construction uses the infinitive form ni, the resulting sentence often has a contrastive meaning, akin to Japanese ～のに no ni:

Unlike the Japanese ～のだ no da form, this construction can be freely used attributively (ex. 5), even in another mermaid construction (ex. 6):

 -(r)o tokodara

This construction uses toko "place." When the preceding clause does not use the stative, it indicates that the action is in progress, about to happen, or nearly happening:

When it does use the stative, it indicates that the action has just happened:

 -(r)o moNdara

This construction uses moN, a reduced form of mono "thing."

When following a non-past expression, this construction is used to indicate what should be done in general cases, often as a kind of hortative expression:

When following a past expression, it instead indicates that the speaker is recalling or reminiscing about the information:

 -(r)o hazudara

This construction uses the bound noun hazu, etymologically derived from the word for "nock," but functioning like a noun meaning "expectation." It indicates something that the speaker expects or expected to happen:

 -(r)o go͡oNdara

This construction uses go͡oN, a reduced form of gooni, which is perhaps a contraction from a form related to Early Middle Japanese ～が様に ga yaũ ni, akin to Modern Japanese ～のように no yō ni. It indicates resemblance or that an action seems to occur:

In order to indicate a plan or objective, go͡oN (and its variants) can also be used by itself, which is a form of mermaid construction in its own right, as it technically contains the copular infinitive N ~ ni. This treats the whole subordinate clause as an adverbial phrase:

Honorific and Humble Speech
Like Japanese, Hachijō has a number of ways to grammatically express honorifics and humility. With regards to verbs, specific expressions can be used to express either honorific or humble meanings.

 is used to exalt others when they are the subject of the sentence. Conversely,  is used to lower oneself when the speaker (or a member of the speaker's in-group) is the subject of the sentence. For honorific speech, most verbs are inflected into their infinitive form, then attached to the auxiliary verb jarowa; e.g., jomowa "to read" → jomi-jarowa "to read (honorific)," roughly equivalent to Standard Japanese お読みになります o-yomi-ni-narimasu. To express humility, most verbs are inflected into their infinitive form, then attached to the auxiliary verb itasowa; e.g., jomowa "to read" → jomi-itasowa "to read (humble)," roughly equivalent to Standard Japanese お読みします o-yomi-shimasu or お読み致します o-yomi-itashimasu.

For verbal adjectives (ending in -kja),  both honorific and humble speech are expressed by using the infinitive form -ku followed by the verb ozjarowa "to be"; the copula dara is similar, becoming de ozjarowa. Both -ku ozjarowa and de ozjarowa can be combined with jarowa and itasowa, as well.

Hachijō does not have a fully-developed  level of speech, but there are a handful of polite verbs that are generally used instead of their basic counterparts in situations where the polite second-person pronoun omi would be used as the subject of a sentence. Outside of these exceptions, however, other verbs remain unchanged with omi. A handful of verbs have suppletive honorific and humble forms, as well. These irregularities are tabulated below:

There are also recorded instances where speakers have used honorific language when a humble meaning is meant, or vice versa, which can be seen as a trend toward a unified polite meaning of both honorific and humble language. A semantic shift has formerly occurred in Japanese as well, wherein the formerly humble Early Middle Japanese verbs 候ふ saurafu and 参らす mawirasu evolved into polite auxiliary verbs: Late Middle Japanese ～さうらう -sɔɔrɔɔ and Modern Japanese ～ます -masu.

See also
 Japanese grammar
 Japanese particles
 Japanese verb conjugation

References

Works cited 

 
  Ph.D. Thesis.
 
 
  Ph.D. Thesis.
 
 
 

ADJ:verbal adjective (形容詞)
INTS:intensifying verbal prefix
STAT:stative (verb derivation)
PASS:passive voice (verb derivation)
POT:potential voice (verb derivation)
CAUS:causative voice (verb derivation)
RET:retrospective mood (verb derivation)
PSTSUBJ:past subjunctive mood (verb derivation)
FIN:final form (verb ending)
IMP:imperative form (finite verb ending)
DUB:dubitative form (finite verb ending)
OPT:optative form (finite verb ending)
REQ:requisitional (finite verb ending)
VOL:volitional (finite verb ending)
EXCL:exclamatory form (finite verb ending)
JPRS:Japanese-style present/nonpast tense (finite verb ending)
JPST:Japanese-style past tense (finite verb ending)
ATTR:attributive form (verb ending)
INF:infinitive (non-finite verb ending)
PTCP:participle (non-finite verb ending)
COND:conditional gerund (non-finite verb ending)
PROV:provisional gerund (non-finite verb ending)
CNCES:concessive gerund (non-finite verb ending)
SIMUL:simultaneous gerund (non-finite verb ending)
INTEN:intentional gerund (non-finite verb ending)
FHYP:futile-hypothetical gerund (non-finite verb ending)
ANT: anterior gerund (non-finite verb ending)
JREP:Japanese-style representative gerund (non-finite verb ending)
PROH:prohibitive (postfix)
PRSM:Japanese-style presumptive (postfix)
JUSS:jussive (postfix)
DECL:declarative particle
Q:question particle
QT:tag question particle
QUOT:quotative-reportative particle
NEG:negative (auxiliary verb)
CNJEC:conjectural extension (attaches to final form)
FOCLZ:focalizing extension (attaches to final form)
SUPP:suppositional extension (attaches to final form)
ORNT:orientative case
LAT:lative case
ALL:allative case
CMPR:comparative case
TERM:terminative case
INS:instrumental/locative case
LOC:locative-instrumental case
ENUM:enumerating particle
INDET:indeterminate pronoun-marking particle
INTERJ:interjection
POL:polite speech
HON:honorific speech
HUM:humble speech
OFNS:offensive speech
NMLZ:nominalized
J:Japanese-borrowed verb form

Japanese grammar
Japonic verbs